Shust can refer to:
Aaron Shust (b. 1975), American musician
Bohdan Shust (b. 1986), Ukrainian football player